Mikołaj Radziwiłł or Nicholas Radziwill may refer to:

Mikalojus Radvila (c. 1450–1509), Grand Chancellor of Lithuania
Mikołaj II Radziwiłł (1470–1521), Grand Chancellor of Lithuania
Mikołaj III Radziwiłł (1492–1530), Bishop of Samogitia
Mikołaj "the Red" Radziwiłł (1512–1584), Voivode of Vilnius, Grand Chancellor and Grand Hetman of Lithuania
Mikołaj "the Black" Radziwiłł (1515–1565),  Voivode of Vilnius, Grand Chancellor and Grand Hetman of Lithuania
Mikołaj VII Radziwiłł (1546–1589),  Voivode of Navahrudak
Mikołaj Krzysztof "the Orphan" Radziwiłł (1549–1616), Grand Marshal of Lithuania, voivode of Trakai and Vilnius
Mikołaj Krzysztof Radziwiłł (1695–1715), Podstoli of Lithuania and starost of Człuchów

See also
Radziwill family